The 2019–20 season is Chacarita Juniors' 2nd consecutive season in the second division of Argentine football, Primera B Nacional.

The season generally covers the period from 1 July 2019 to 30 June 2020.

Review

Pre-season
Academy prospect Franco Romero was sold to San Lorenzo on 23 May. Juan Cruz Mascia agreed to join on 10 June 2019, signing from Indian Super League side NorthEast United. Matías Nizzo extended his loan with Deportivo Morón on 14 June. Zacarías Morán and Ignacio Cacheiro joined on 18/24 June. They played their opening friendly on 26 June, though failed to find victory across two fixtures versus Futbolistas Argentinos Agremiados; a team of free agents - Luciano Perdomo featured as a trialist for Chacarita. He signed hours later. The club went three games winless in pre-season on 29 June, as Banfield beat them 2–1 in the first of two matches; though Mascia did notch his first goal. Chacarita later won 2–1 after Lucas Lezcano and Maximiliano Paredes goals.

Loans from 2018 to 2019 officially expired on and around 30 June. Two more new players was announced on 1 July, with Brian Mieres and Adrián Torres coming from Primera B Nacional duo Mitre and Almagro. Rodrigo Ayala, who had been released on 21 June, headed off to Independiente Rivadavia on 2 July, which preceded defender Franco Racca switching Chacarita for Atlético de Rafaela on 3 July. Facundo Melivilo returned to Central Córdoba on loan on 3 July. Left winger Ignacio Bailone and goalkeeper Sebastián Cuerdo signed on 3 July, which preceded Salvador Sánchez (Olimpo) becoming Chacarita's ninth acquisition. Nicolás Álvarez joined Defensores de Belgrano on 5 July. Chacarita held top-flight Defensa y Justicia to pre-season draws on 6 July.

Chacarita made it just one win from eight exhibition matches on 13 July, after failing to defeat Almagro in Moreno. Nehuen Montoya and Maximiliano Paredes' loans to Tristán Suárez and Atlético de Rafaela were confirmed on 16 July. Also on that day, Nicolás Vidal went to General Lamadrid after terminating his contract. Their streak of no pre-season win was extended to six on 17 July, as they drew 2–2 and lost 1–2 to Tristán Suárez. Leonardo Baima switched to Nueva Chicago on 19 July. 20 July saw Chacarita gain their second and third pre-season wins after defeating Comunicaciones across two encounters. A third goalless tie of pre-season came on 24 July versus Justo José de Urquiza, though a 3–2 win followed. An Estudiantes (BA) game was cancelled on 26 July.

Hernán Da Campo was loaned from Rosario Central on 29 July. On 31 July, Chacarita hosted an exhibition encounter with Almirante Brown - as a 1–1 draw was followed by a 4–1 win. 2 August saw Matías García arrive from Unión Santa Fe. Guillermo Brown were Chacarita's ninth opponent of pre-season on 3 August, with the two Primera B Nacional clubs sharing victories at the Estadio Chacarita Juniors. They then played against Fénix in a friendly on 7 August, as they secured a draw and a victory over the Pilar team. Centre-back Germán Ré departed to Villa San Carlos on 9 August. A friendly, set for 10 August, with Quilmes was cancelled due to bad weather.

August
Chacarita opened their competitive campaign in Primera B Nacional with a goalless draw with All Boys on 15 August, in a fixture that was played behind closed doors due to the threat of fan violence; after pre-match skirmishes in local bars where gunfire was heard. A 2–1 loss at the hands of Gimnasia y Esgrima (J) on 24 August made it no win in two league games for Chacarita. Chacarita had friendlies with Sacachispas on 26 August, as Elías Alderete scored in both a 1–1 draw and, twice, in a 3–1 victory. On 31 August, Chacarita lost by three goals at home to Santamarina. Patricio Pisano resigned as manager shortly after.

September
Luis Marabotto was appointed as interim manager on 2 September.

Squad

Transfers
Domestic transfer windows:3 July 2019 to 24 September 201920 January 2020 to 19 February 2020.

Transfers in

Transfers out

Loans in

Loans out

Friendlies

Pre-season
Chacarita Juniors announced their initial pre-season schedule on 20 June 2019. They'd visit Primera División duo Banfield (2) and Defensa y Justicia on 29 June and 6 July, before meeting Almagro, Tristán Suárez, Comunicaciones, Justo José de Urquiza and Estudiantes across the rest of July. The venue for the latter five fixtures was revealed on 23 June, as were the place for the Banfield encounters. On that day, matches with Futbolistas Argentinos Agremiados, a team made up of free agents, were set for 26 June. They'd face Almirante Brown in late July, prior to meeting Guillermo Brown, Fénix and Quilmes in early August.

Mid-season
Chacarita faced Sacachispas of Primera B Metropolitana in a mid-season match on 26 August.

Competitions

Primera B Nacional

Results summary

Matches
The fixtures for the 2019–20 league season were announced on 1 August 2019, with a new format of split zones being introduced. Chacarita Juniors were drawn in Zone B.

Squad statistics

Appearances and goals

Statistics accurate as of 3 September 2019.

Goalscorers

Notes

References

Chacarita Juniors seasons
Chacarita Juniors